Astilpnus is a genus of beetles in the family Silvanidae, containing the following species:

 Astilpnus multistriolatus Perris, 1866
 Astilpnus reflexicollis (Motschulsky, 1868)

References

Silvanidae genera